The 2021 European Tour was the 50th season of golf tournaments since the European Tour officially began in 1972 and the 13th and final edition of the Race to Dubai.

The Race to Dubai was won by Collin Morikawa, becoming the first American player to do so. Matti Schmid was named Rookie of the Year.

Changes for 2021
Following a heavily disrupted 2020 season due to the COVID-19 pandemic, there was a new look to the calendar announced in December 2020, with tournaments being scheduled in groups based on location. The Rolex Series was also reduced to just four tournaments - the Abu Dhabi HSBC Championship, the Abrdn Scottish Open, the BMW PGA Championship and the season ending DP World Tour Championship, Dubai.

Schedule
The following table lists official events during the 2021 season.

Unofficial events
The following events were sanctioned by the European Tour, but did not carry official money, nor were wins official.

Location of tournaments

Race to Dubai
Final top 10 players in the Race to Dubai:

• Did not play

Awards

See also
2021 in golf
2021 Challenge Tour
2021 European Senior Tour
2021 Ladies European Tour
2020–21 PGA Tour
2021–22 PGA Tour

Notes

References

External links
Official site

2021
2021 in golf